T'allani Urqu (Aymara t'alla noble woman, lady, -ni a suffix, Quechua urqu mountain, "the mountain with a noble woman", Hispanicized spelling Tallani Orcco) is a mountain in the Andes of Peru which reaches a height of approximately . It is located in the Arequipa Region, Caylloma Province, Caylloma District, and in the Condesuyos Province, Cayarani District. T'allani Urqu lies southeast of Kuntur Salla.

References 

Mountains of Peru
Mountains of Arequipa Region